Claude La Haye is a Canadian production sound mixer, best known internationally as the sound mixer of Arrival (2016), for which he won the BAFTA Award for Best Sound (shared with Bernard Gariépy Strobl and Sylvain Bellemare) and was nominated for the Academy Award for Best Sound Mixing (shared with Strobl). He has been sound mixer/recordist/engineer on many prominent films shot in the province of Quebec including The Red Violin (1998), The Human Stain (2003), Taking Lives (2004), My Internship in Canada (2015), Brooklyn (2015), and Race (2016).

Awards and nominations

References

External links
 
 Interview - A Sound Effect

Living people
Best Sound BAFTA Award winners
Best Sound Genie and Canadian Screen Award winners
Canadian audio engineers
Year of birth missing (living people)